Lowell Peterson (December 11, 1921 – January 7, 1989) was an American politician in the state of Washington. He served in the Washington State Senate from 1965 to 1987.

References

1989 deaths
1921 births
Democratic Party Washington (state) state senators
20th-century American politicians
People from Okanogan County, Washington